Joseph Louis Proust (26 September 1754 – 5 July 1826) was a French chemist. He was best known for his discovery of the law of definite proportions in 1794, stating that chemical compounds always combine in constant proportions.

Life
Joseph L. Proust was born on September 26, 1754, in Angers, France. His father served as an apothecary in Angers. Joseph studied chemistry in his father's shop and later went to Paris where he gained the appointment of apothecary in chief to the Salpêtrière. He also taught chemistry with Pilâtre de Rozier, a famous aeronaut.

Under Carlos IV's influence Proust went to Spain. There he taught at the Chemistry School in Segovia and at the University of Salamanca.
But when Napoleon invaded Spain, they burned Proust's laboratory and forced him back to France. On July 5, 1826, he died in Angers, France. The mineral proustite (Ag3AsS3) is named in his honour.

Chemistry studies

Proust's largest accomplishment in the realm of science was disproving Berthollet with the law of definite proportions, which is sometimes also known as Proust's Law. Proust studied copper carbonate, the two tin oxides, and the two iron sulfides to prove this law. He did this by making artificial copper carbonate and comparing it to natural copper carbonate. With this he showed that each had the same proportion of weights between the three elements involved (Cu, C, O). Between the two types of the other compounds, Proust showed that no intermediate compounds exist between them. Proust published this paper in 1794, but the law was not accepted until 1812, when the Swedish chemist Jöns Jacob Berzelius gave him credit for it.

There are, however, exceptions to the Law of Definite Proportions. An entire class of substances does not follow this rule. The compounds are called non-stoichiometric compounds, or Berthollides, after Berthollet. The ratio of the elements present in the compound can fluctuate within certain limits, such as for example ferrous oxide. The ideal formula is FeO, but due to crystallographic vacancies it is reduced to about Fe0.95O.

Proust was also interested in studying the sugars that are present in sweet vegetables and fruits. In 1799, Proust demonstrated, to his class in Madrid, how the sugar in grapes is identical to that found in honey.

Works

Translated to German in Journal für die Chemie und Physik vol. 1 (1806) p. 249-270

References

External links

 Joseph Louis Proust (1754–1826)

1754 births
1826 deaths
18th-century French chemists
People from Angers
Flight altitude record holders
Members of the French Academy of Sciences
Academic staff of the University of Salamanca
French aviation record holders
19th-century French chemists